Muthu Mandapam is a 1962 Indian Tamil-language film directed by A. S. A. Sami. The film was produced by S. S. Rajendran who also stars alongside R. Vijayakumari. It was released on 27 October 1962.

Plot

Cast 
The following lists were compiled from the film credits (see external links) and from the database of Film News Anandan
S. S. Rajendran
R. Vijayakumari
M. R. Radha
S. V. Ranga Rao
S. A. Asokan
S. Rama Rao
D. V. Narayanasamy
S. P. Veerasamy
K. Chandrakantha
Manorama
Shantha
Indhira
Bhagavathi
Premavathi

Production 
The film was produced by S. S. Rajendran under his own banner Rajendran Pictures. He was also a member in Tamil Nadu Legislative Assembly at that time and his name is shown as S. S. Rajendran MLA in the film credits.

Soundtrack 
Music was composed by K. V. Mahadevan, while the lyrics were penned by Kannadasan and M. K. Athmanathan.

References

External links 

1960s Tamil-language films
1962 drama films
Films scored by K. V. Mahadevan
Indian drama films